Jolas may refer to:

 Members of the Jola people of West Africa 
 Betsy Jolas (born 1926), Franco–American composer
 Eugene Jolas (1894–1952), American translator and literary critic
 Maria Jolas (1893–1987), a founder of literary magazine transition

See also
 Jola (disambiguation)